The  Class B XI engines of the Royal Bavarian State Railways (Königlich Bayerische Staatsbahn) were built between 1895 and 1900 by the firm of Maffei for deployment in Bavaria. The first delivery comprised 39 vehicles with two-cylinder, saturated steam operation, a further 100 two-cylinder compound locomotives followed in the period up to 1900.

The Deutsche Reichsbahn took over 8 engines from the first batch as Class 36.7,  with operating numbers 36 701 to 36 708, and 76 of the second batch, with numbers 36 751 to 36 826.

These steam locomotives were equipped with Bavarian 3 T 12, 3 T 14.5 and 2'2' T 18 tenders. These vehicles were the first locos that were give a four-axle tender.

See also 
 Royal Bavarian State Railways
 List of Bavarian locomotives and railbuses

References 

 This page incorporates a translation of the equivalent page on the German language Wikipedia
 

4-4-0 locomotives
B 11
Standard gauge locomotives of Germany
Railway locomotives introduced in 1892
2′B n2 locomotives
2′B n2v locomotives
Maffei locomotives
Krauss locomotives
Passenger locomotives